The following is a list of countries by raw cotton exports. Data is for 2020, in millions of United States dollars, as reported by The International Trade Centre. Currently the top fifteen countries are listed.

References
- International Trade Centre Statistics (Countries that export raw cotton 2019)

Cotton
exports